Thomas E. Cooney is a former American diplomat who most recently served as the charge d'affaires of the United States Embassy to Buenos Aires, Argentina from 2017 to 2018. He retired from the State Department with the senior rank of Minister Counselor in 2019 and became Vice President of Global Public Policy for General Motors in Detroit.

Career
Cooney, a native of Detroit, speaks Spanish and Mandarin Chinese. He was a career member of the U.S. foreign service, having served as a foreign policy advisor to the Commanding General of the United States Army, Pacific and as Deputy Consul General to the Consulate General in Hong Kong and Macau. He was the Deputy Commissioner General for the USA pavilion at Expo 2010 during his tenure as Public Affairs Officer of the United States Consulate General Shanghai.

Cooney became Deputy Chief of Mission of the U.S. Diplomatic Mission to Argentina on July 30, 2016, and took office as the interim Ambassador to Argentina upon the resignation of Noah Mamet on January 20, 2017. At the end of his term in May of 2019, the Argentine government recognized him with the Order of the Liberator General San Martin, the highest honor conferred to non-citizens by the government of Argentina.

In 2019, he was hired by General Motors to lead its international government relations teams globally. In 2021, Cooney joined the board of directors of Global Ties Detroit, a non-profit that seeks to strengthen Detroit’s international partnerships.

References

Ambassadors of the United States to Argentina
Cornell University alumni
University of South Carolina alumni
United States Foreign Service personnel
Living people
Year of birth missing (living people)
People from Detroit